4-Chlorophenoxyacetic acid or parachlorophenoxyacetate (pCPA) is a synthetic pesticide similar to chemicals in a group of plant hormones called auxins.

A proven use is in the synthesis of Fipexide.

References

External links
 Reregistration Eligibility Decision (RED): 4-Chlorophenoxy-acetic Acid (4-CPA), United States Environmental Protection Agency

Phenoxyacetic acids
Chlorobenzenes
Auxinic herbicides
NOT WORKING